Production fluid is the fluid mixture of oil,  gas and water in formation fluid that flows to the surface of an oil well from a reservoir.  Its consistency and composition varies.

Fluids may be described by a multitude of characteristics including:
Water cut - the proportion of the fluid, which is water rather than hydrocarbons.
API gravity - the oilfield measurement of the weight of the hydrocarbons.
GOR - Gas to oil ratio describing how many standard cubic feet of gas can be obtained for every  stock tank barrel of oil.
 H2S - the concentration of this gas.  Fluids with a high concentration of H2S are described as "sour".

External links
 Schlumberger Oilfield Glossary: produced fluid 

Petroleum production
Natural gas